The Tahiti Championship is a domestic rugby union club competition that is played in Tahiti. Created in 1971, the Tahiti Championship is at the top of the national league system operated by the Polynesian Rugby Federation (Tahiti), also known by its French initialism of FPR. There is promotion and relegation between the Tahiti Championship and the next level down, the Tahiti Championship D2. The seven best rugby teams in Tahiti participate in the competition, hence the name Championnat de Tahiti. The competition previously had more teams, but the league was split into two divisions.

Many local French Polynesian players began their careers here in this league before moving to France to compete in the divisions of Ligue Nationale de Rugby.

The first ever final took place in 1971, Paea won the inaugural season. The competition has been held on an annual basis since, except in 1995 and 1997. Paea is the most successful club in the competition with 18 titles. Rugby is a hit in French Polynesia, especially in Tahiti, it is a great place to play rugby in paradise.

Current Teams
2020 season

Table

<noinclude>

Notes

Official Source: Fédération Polynésienne de Rugby - Accueil

External links
 Official site
 For English. Use google chrome for translation.

Rugby union in Tahiti
Rugby union competitions in Oceania